Belorusy i rynok is the main business weekly newspaper published in Belarus.

The newspaper was founded in 1990 under the name Belorusskij rynok (Белорусский рынок, The Belarusian Market) and was one of the first private media in Belarus.

In 2005 the newspaper had to change its name following a decree of president Lukashenka that forbid usage of the words National and Belarusian in names of organisations and newspapers.

Current chief editor is Viačasłaŭ Chadasoŭski.

The newspaper is published mainly in Russian language.

External links
 

1990 establishments in Belarus
Publications established in 1990
Russian-language newspapers published in Belarus
Weekly newspapers
Business newspapers
Mass media in Minsk
Business in Belarus
Free Media Awards winners